The Calgary–Edmonton Corridor is a geographical region of the Canadian province of Alberta. It is the most urbanized area in Alberta and is one of Canada's four most urban regions. It consists of Statistics Canada Alberta census divisions No. 11, No. 8, and No. 6. It includes the entire census metropolitan areas of Calgary and Edmonton and the census agglomerations of Red Deer and Wetaskiwin.

Transportation 
Alberta Highway 2, also known as the Queen Elizabeth II Highway or QE2, is the busiest highway in Alberta and forms the central spine of the corridor. 

A Canadian Pacific rail line, originally built by the Calgary and Edmonton Railway in 1891, roughly parallels the highway. The line has been used exclusively by freight trains since 1985, when Via Rail discontinued its Calgary–South Edmonton train service. There have been several proposal and studies for high-speed rail through the region.

The corridor has two of Canada's five busiest airports: Calgary International and Edmonton International. The number of daily flights between these two airports number into the dozens, making it one of Canada's busiest commuter flight routes.

Demographics 
In the Canada 2001 Census, the population of the Calgary–Edmonton Corridor was 2,149,586, representing 72.3% of Alberta's population. In the Canada 2011 Census, the corridor's population had increased to 2,703,380 or 74.2% of the province's population. The population as of the Canada 2016 Census was 3,074,223.

The following presents the historic population growth of the Calgary–Edmonton Corridor between 1996 and 2016 by its three census divisions.

Growth 
The Calgary–Edmonton Corridor is one of the fastest growing regions and wealthiest regions in Canada. A 2003 study by TD Bank Financial Group found the GDP per capita in the corridor is 10% above average compared to U.S. metropolitan areas and 40% above average compared to other Canadian cities. Much of this is because of large oil revenues due to the growing cost of oil since 2003.

Census subdivisions 
The following are lists of the census subdivisions within the Calgary Metropolitan Region and Edmonton Metropolitan Region portions of the Calgary–Edmonton Corridor. The Edmonton Metropolitan Region's eight summer villages are not listed.

 Calgary Metropolitan Region
 Airdrie
 Beiseker
 Calgary
 Chestermere
 Cochrane
 Crossfield
 Diamond Valley
 Eden Valley 216 (Stoney First Nation)
 Foothills County
 High River
 Irricana
 Longview
 Okotoks
 Rocky View County
 Tsuu T'ina Nation 145 (Tsuu T'ina Nation)

 Edmonton Metropolitan Region
 Alexander 134 (Alexander First Nation)
 Beaumont
 Bon Accord
 Bruderheim
 Calmar
 Devon
 Edmonton
 Enoch Cree Nation 135 (Enoch Cree Nation)
 Fort Saskatchewan
 Gibbons
 Leduc
 Leduc County
 Legal
 Morinville
 Parkland County
 Redwater
 Spring Lake
 Spruce Grove
 St. Albert
 Stony Plain
 Strathcona County
 Sturgeon County
 Thorsby
 Wabamun
 Warburg
 Wabamun 133A & 133B (Paul First Nation)

Gallery

See also 

 List of census divisions of Alberta
 List of communities in Alberta
 Golden Horseshoe
 Greater Montreal
 Quebec City–Windsor corridor

References

External links 
 Statistics Canada Information
 Potential for high speed rail

Geographic regions of Alberta
Transport corridors